State Route 401 (SR 401) is a  long state highway in Pacific County within the U.S. state of Washington. The road was designated Secondary State Highway 12B (SSH 12) between 1937 and 1964, when SR 401 was created to replace SSH 12B. The Astoria–Megler Bridge, completed in 1966, replaced a ferry east of the bridge, where the highway originally ended, and is known locally as Kingston Ferry Road. The roadway was extended west to the north end of the bridge, where it currently terminates. The former ferry terminal became the Dismal Nitch rest area, named after the Lewis and Clark Expedition's description of the place.

Route description

Traveling northeast between cliffs and the Columbia River past the Dismal Nitch Safety rest area to Knappton, the highway turns north along more cliffs and the South Fork of the Naselle River. The intersection with SR 4 is also the busiest segment of the road with an estimated daily average of 2,800 motorists, which has been decreasing from 3,100 motorists in 2005.

History

The highway ran from PSH 12 / US 101 at the Megler ferry landing on the Columbia River to PSH 12 / US 830 in Naselle, with a gap between Megler and Knappton. The full highway was opened in October 1962, ahead of the expected completion of the Astoria–Megler Bridge, which opened in 1966.

SSH 12B became SR 401 during the 1964 highway renumbering. The Dismal Nitch Safety rest area, formerly the Megler Landing Rest Area, was remodeled twice in 2007 to be accessible year-round.

Major intersections

References

External links

Highways of Washington State

401
Transportation in Pacific County, Washington